Muhammad Pasha of Rawanduz (also known as Mirê Kor - the "blind prince"; born in Rawandiz; 1783–1838) was Kurdish Mir of the Soran Emirate (1813–1838). He led an unsuccessful attack against the Emirate of Botan of Bedir Khan Beg in 1834.

Muhammad Pasha of Rawanduz was repeatedly responsible for massacres of the Yazidis. In 1832, thousands of Yazidis were killed in the Shekhan area by Muhammad Pasha of Rawanduz in cooperation with the Kurdish Botan prince Bedir Khan Beg.

In 1834 he tried to subdue the Assyrians of Tyari but suffered a humiliating defeat. This defeat played a major role in the collapse of the Soran Emirate.

See also 
Persecution of Yazidis by Kurds

References 

1783 births
1838 deaths
Political people from the Ottoman Empire
Ottoman Kurdish politicians
Kurdish people from the Ottoman Empire
19th-century rulers in Asia
18th-century Kurdish people
19th-century Kurdish people